Vasastan is a district in central Gothenburg, Sweden. While nearby Haga was a suburb for the working class with wooden houses, Vasastan was built in stone in neo-renaissance and baroque style for the wealthy middle class. Vasastan was built in the latter half of the 19th century when the city expanded outside the city walls.

Gothenburg